Duncan Zowie Haywood Jones (born 30 May 1971) is a British film director, film producer and screenwriter. He is best known for directing the films Moon (2009), Source Code (2011), Warcraft (2016), and Mute (2018). For Moon, he won the BAFTA Award for Outstanding Debut by a British Writer, Director or Producer. He is the son of English singer-songwriter David Bowie and American model, actress, and journalist Angie Bowie.

Early life
Jones was born in Bromley Hospital, Bromley, London, on 30 May 1971, the only child of English singer-songwriter and musician David Bowie (1947-2016) and his first wife, Angela "Angie" Bowie (née Barnett), an American model and actress. His maternal grandfather, George, was a United States Army veteran and mining engineer who ran a mill for the Cyprus Mines Corporation, while his maternal grandmother, Helena, was a naturalised Canadian. His mother was born and raised in Cyprus, and has Polish ancestry. His birth prompted his father to write "Kooks" for his 1971 album Hunky Dory.

Mostly raised by his father David and his Scottish nanny, Marion Skene, Jones spent time growing up in London, Berlin, and Vevey in Switzerland. He attended the first and second grade at the Commonwealth American School (now the International School of Lausanne) in Lausanne. When his parents divorced in February 1980, his father was granted custody of eight-year-old Jones (who was then known as "Zowie Bowie" to rhyme with his father's stage name) and he visited his mother on school holidays until ending contact with her at age 13. At age 14, he enrolled in the Scottish co-educational boarding school Gordonstoun. At the age of 12, he decided that he preferred to be called "Joey", and used this nickname until shortening it to "Joe" in his later teen years. The press reported that he went by "Joe" in 1992 when attending his father's wedding to fashion model Iman, where he was the best man. He reverted to his birth name around the age of 18.

Jones is the half-brother of Alexandria "Lexi" Jones (born 2000), the daughter of his father and his father's second wife, Iman. He is also the half-brother of Stacia Larranna Celeste Lipka (born 1980) from his mother's relationship with musician Andrew Lipka, better known as Drew Blood. He has a stepsister, Zulekha Haywood (born 1978), who is the daughter of Iman and former NBA basketball player Spencer Haywood, Iman's first husband.

By 1995, Jones graduated with a bachelor's degree in philosophy from the College of Wooster. He then pursued a PhD degree at Vanderbilt University in Tennessee, but left before completion to attend London Film School, where he then graduated in 2001. Whilst growing up, Jones dreamed of becoming a professional wrestler, and his father frequently praised what he called Jones' "natural strength".

Career

Jones was one of many cameramen at his father's widely televised 50th birthday party directed by Englishman Tim Pope at Madison Square Garden in 1997 and also at two BowieNet concerts at Roseland Ballroom in New York City in June 2000. He was also the in-game cinematics director for the political simulator Republic: The Revolution, as well as scripting elements of the game.

Jones directed the 2006 campaign for the French Connection fashion label. The concept of 'Fashion vs Style' was to re-invigorate the brand and move it away from the former incarnation of FCUK, which style pundits believed had become tired and overused. The advert debuted in the week ending 20 February 2006 and featured two women (representing fashion and style) fighting and briefly kissing each other. The advertisement generated 127 complaints to the Advertising Standards Authority.

Jones's first feature film, Moon, was nominated for seven British Independent Film Awards in 2009, and won two, Best British Independent Film, and the Douglas Hickox Award for Best British Director on their debut feature. It was also nominated for two BAFTA Awards at the 2010 ceremony, winning Jones the BAFTA Award for Outstanding Debut by a British Writer, Director or Producer. The film has received 19 other nominations from film festivals and societies, including the BAFTA Carl Foreman Award.

He directed the Summit Entertainment project Source Code, a science-fiction thriller from Vendome Pictures, which was produced by Mark Gordon. Source Code was released on DVD and Blu-ray on 26July 2011 in the United States.

Jones directed and co-wrote Warcraft, based on the video game series of the same name, which was released in the summer of 2016. His next film would return to the science fiction genre and be called Mute, starring Alexander Skarsgård and Paul Rudd. Jones had been developing the project for years and described it as a "spiritual sequel" to Moon, and was inspired by Ridley Scott's Blade Runner. The film, set in Berlin forty years in the future, follows a mute bartender investigating his lover's disappearance. The film was produced and released by Netflix, and became available to stream world-wide in February 2018.

Through his social media, Jones announced in July 2018 that his next project would be a science fiction film, based on the 2000 AD Comics character Rogue Trooper. In July 2019 he told Entertainment Weekly, "The script is really looking pretty good now. It's getting to the point where we're going to have to start casting and making the thing."

Personal life
Jones became engaged to photographer Rodene Ronquillo on 28 June 2012. They married on 6 November 2012. On the same day, Ronquillo was diagnosed with breast cancer. The couple have campaigned for the awareness for the disease and for early diagnosis. On 10 July 2016, Ronquillo gave birth to their first child, a son. On 1 October 2017, Jones announced that he and Ronquillo were expecting a second child. Jones announced the birth of their daughter on 18 April 2018. He named her Zowie, after his own childhood name.

Filmography

Bibliography

Awards and nominations

References

External links

 
 

1971 births
Living people
Advertising directors
Alumni of the London Film School
College of Wooster alumni
English people of Cypriot descent
Fantasy film directors
Film directors from London
Outstanding Debut by a British Writer, Director or Producer BAFTA Award winners
People educated at Gordonstoun
People from Bromley
Science fiction film directors
Hugo Award-winning writers